MacKay is a locality in west-central Alberta, Canada within Yellowhead County.

Statistics Canada recognizes MacKay as a designated place. It was designated as a hamlet between 1979 and 2019.

History 
MacKay was designated a hamlet by the Government of Alberta on May 14, 1979 for the purpose of accessing street restoration funding. Yellowhead County repealed the hamlet designation on February 26, 2019.

Demographics 

See also 
List of communities in Alberta
List of designated places in Alberta

References 

Designated places in Alberta
Former hamlets in Alberta
Localities in Yellowhead County
Yellowhead County